Stigmella nakamurai is a moth of the family Nepticulidae. It is only known from Hokkaido in Japan.

Adults are on wing in August. There is probably one generation per year.

The larvae feed on Ulmus davidiana var. japonica. They mine the leaves of their host plant. The mine is located on the upper-side of the leaf and is linear and usually dark brown in older mines. The mine is filled with coiled or dispersed frass, except on extreme margins of mine. The first half of the mine is much contorted, with convolutions contiguous. The second half is less contorted and often sinuous or nearly straight.

External links
Japanese Species Of The Genus Stigmella (Nepticulidae: Lepidoptera)

Nepticulidae
Moths of Japan
Moths described in 1985